Basic Education High School No. 8 Mandalay (formerly, St. Joseph's Convent School) is a public high school in downtown Mandalay, Myanmar. The all-girls school offers classes from kindergarten to Tenth Standard to about 3600 students.

Campus
BEHS 8 Mandalay consists of 11 buildings: "Ya Pyay Building", "Hnin Thiri Building", "Tha Pyay Building", "A Ti Dar Building", "Mi-Ba Myitta Building", "Shwe Pyi Tan Saung Building", "Ziwa Building", "Aye Yadana Building", "Cherry Building", "A Ka Yi Building", and "Thazin Building".

List of headmistresses
The all-girls school has been administered by headmistresses.

Girls' schools in Myanmar
High schools in Mandalay